Ivana Hloužková (6 June 19606 March 2023) was a Czech actress and two-time Alfréd Radok Award winner.

Hloužková won her first Alfréd Radok Award for Best Actress in 1995 for her portrayal of the title role in the play Maryša at the Goose on a String Theatre in Brno. In 2012 she was again named Best Actress at the same award ceremony for her role of Miroslav Tichý in the play Tichý Tarzan, again at the Goose on a String Theatre. Although she was principally a stage actress, she acted in films including The Fortress (1994) and Boredom in Brno (2003).

Hloužková died on 6 March 2023, at the age of 62.

References

External links

1960 births
2023 deaths
People from Valtice
Czech television actresses
Czech film actresses
Czech stage actresses
20th-century Czech actresses
21st-century Czech actresses